Yaroslav Kuzminov is a Russian economist. He was the rector of the Higher School of Economics from 1992 to 2021.

References

Russian economists

Living people
Year of birth missing (living people)